The following is a list of yé-yé singers, a genre of pop music and associated youth culture that originated in the early 1960s in France and spread to other countries like Spain, Portugal and Italy. A female-fronted phenomenon, yé-yé singers were mostly teenage girls that sung flirty love songs. Nevertheless, almost all of the songwriters were male, as were the heads in the music industry and the specialized press.

A
 Adele
 Adriángela
 Audrey

B
 Ana Belén
 Betina
 Jane Birkin
 Brigitte Bardot

C
 Camille
 Céline
 Cléo
 Clothilde
 Albertina Cortés
 Cosette

D
 Dani
  Catherine Desmarets
 Rocío Dúrcal

E
 Élizabeth
 Elsa
 Evy

G
 Serge Gainsbourg
 France Gall
 Gelu
 Géraldine
 Chantal Goya

H
 Johnny Hallyday
 Françoise Hardy
 Gillian Hills

J
 Jocelyne

K
 Karina
 Katty Linez
 Chantal Kelly

L
 Christie Laume
 Elsa Leroy
 Katty Line

M
 Marisol
 Massiel

O
 Olivia

P
 Annie Philippe
 Christine Pilzer
 Pussy Cat

R
 Rosalía

S
 Salomé
 Sandro de América
 Sheila
 Natacha Snitkine

T
 Jacqueline Taïeb
 Luisita Tenor
 Monique Thubert

V
 Stella Vander
 Sylvie Vartan
 Concha Velasco
 Vetty 
 Virginie

Z
 Zouzou

Notes

References
 

Lists of pop musicians
Yé-yé
Yé-yé singers